Octyl salicylate, or 2-ethylhexyl salicylate, is an organic compound used as an ingredient in sunscreens and cosmetics to absorb UVB (ultraviolet) rays from the sun. It is an ester formed by the condensation of salicylic acid with 2-ethylhexanol.  It is a colorless oily liquid with a slight floral odor.

The salicylate portion of the molecule absorbs ultraviolet light, protecting skin from the harmful effects of exposure to sunlight.  The ethylhexanol portion is a fatty alcohol, adding emollient and oil-like (water resistant) properties.

Safety 
Octisalate and all other salicylates have a good safety profile. It is often used to improve affinity and reduce photodegradation of other sunscreen ingredients (such as oxybenzone and avobenzone), and <1% of the applied dose of Octisalate penetrates through the skin. Although Octisalate is a weaker UVB absorber it has superior stability than some other sunscreen active ingredients and does not produce reactive oxygen species when exposed to sunlight. However, it does have some minor sensitization potential; with some  individuals experiencing  minimal to mild skin irritation.

Notes

References
 

Salicylate esters
Sunscreening agents
3-Hydroxypropenals